Barishal Football Academy are a Bangladeshi women's football club based in Barishal that competes in the Bangladesh Women's Football League, the top flight of women's football in Bangladesh.

History
The Barishal Football Academy was founded in 10 January 2020. Bangladesh Football Federation (BFF) gave the club permission to participate in the league. The club will compete in the  2021–22 Bangladesh Women's Football League which starts in November 2022.

Season 2021–22
Barishal FA was played their debut game against Jamalpur Kacharipara Akadas on 17 November 2022 at Dhaka which won by 4–0.

Current squad
The following squad were named for 2021–22 BWFL season.

Competitive record

Head coach records

Club management

Current technical staff
As of 14 October 2022

Board of director
As of 14 October 2022

References

2022 establishments in Bangladesh
Association football clubs established in 2022
Women's football clubs in Bangladesh